James Austin Killingsworth (June 19, 1923 – June 10, 2007) was an American college basketball coach. He was best known for his tenures at Idaho State University and Texas Christian University (TCU).

Born in Checotah, Oklahoma, Killingsworth played college basketball at Northeastern State College in Tahlequah and began his coaching career in 1948 at the high school level in Oklahoma. After many years of success, he left for the college ranks to coach the freshman team at Tulsa, then took a head coaching job at Cerritos College in southern California in 1964. In seven seasons at Cerritos, Killingsworth compiled a  record and led the Falcons to the 1968 California junior college championship.

In March 1971, he was hired as head coach at Idaho State in the Big Sky Conference, succeeding Dan Miller. In his six seasons in Pocatello, Killingsworth led the Bengals to a  record, including three Big Sky regular-season titles and the second tournament title in 1977. The  season was his last at ISU and was capped off by a run to the Elite Eight of the NCAA tournament, following a one-point upset of UCLA in the Sweet Sixteen in Provo, Utah, behind the play of  center   The Bengals led by a point at the half against UNLV, but lost by seventeen and ended the year at 

Following his successful run at Idaho State, Killingsworth was hired as head coach at Oklahoma State after Kansas State's Jack Hartman took the job and resigned two days  After two losing seasons, the first in his career at any level, he left the Cowboys to take the head coaching job at TCU in the Southwest Conference  Nicknamed "Killer" during his time at Fort Worth, Killingsworth raised the profile of a school that had experienced limited basketball success in recent seasons. In eight seasons, he led his team to a  record, and in  he led the team to a  record, an SWC title, and the team's first NCAA tournament appearance in 16 years. Following that season, Killingsworth retired after 38 years 

Killingsworth died in Tulsa in 2007 at

Head coaching record

 1974 team won an unscheduled playoff game for the NCAA berth

References

External links
 Sports Reference – Jim Killingsworth

1923 births
2007 deaths
American men's basketball coaches
American men's basketball players
Basketball coaches from Oklahoma
Basketball players from Oklahoma
College men's basketball head coaches in the United States
High school basketball coaches in the United States
Idaho State Bengals men's basketball coaches
Junior college men's basketball coaches in the United States
Northeastern State RiverHawks men's basketball players
Oklahoma State Cowboys basketball coaches
People from Checotah, Oklahoma
TCU Horned Frogs men's basketball coaches
University of Oklahoma alumni
Guards (basketball)